Shirley McIntosh MBE (born 8 July 1965) is a retired Scottish sports shooter.

Career
McIntosh won a Gold and a Silver in the 1994 Commonwealth Games. At the 1998 Commonwealth Games she won Bronze in the Women's 50 metre rifle three position pairs and Bronze in the 50m rifle prone pairs, making her the second Scottish Woman to win four Commonwealth Games medals.

McIntosh is the mother of five-times Scottish Commonwealth Games medalist Jennifer McIntosh and 2014 Commonwealth Games competitor Seonaid McIntosh.

McIntosh was appointed Member of the Order of the British Empire (MBE) in the 1996 New Year Honours for services to shooting.

McIntosh was inducted into the University of Edinburgh Sports Hall of Fame in 2011 and into the Scottish Sports Hall of Fame in 2015.

References

External links

Scottish female sport shooters
British female sport shooters
ISSF rifle shooters
Commonwealth Games gold medallists for Scotland
Commonwealth Games silver medallists for Scotland
Commonwealth Games bronze medallists for Scotland
Shooters at the 1994 Commonwealth Games
Shooters at the 1998 Commonwealth Games
Alumni of the University of Edinburgh
People educated at Dollar Academy
Sportspeople from Falkirk
1965 births
Living people
Commonwealth Games medallists in shooting
Members of the Order of the British Empire
Medallists at the 1994 Commonwealth Games
Medallists at the 1998 Commonwealth Games